The Cathedral of the Sacred Heart in Richmond, Virginia, is the seat of the Roman Catholic Diocese of Richmond. The property is located along North Laurel Street at 823 Cathedral Place, facing Monroe Park one block north of Main Street. Construction of the cathedral was begun in 1903, financed by donations of Thomas Fortune Ryan and his wife; it was the only cathedral at that time known to be constructed by the exclusive patronage of a single family.

The cathedral was completed in 1905 and consecrated on Thanksgiving Day, November 29, 1906. The cathedral is a Virginia Historic Landmark and is on the National Register of Historic Places.

The Cathedral of the Sacred Heart hosts the Catholic Campus Ministry for Virginia Commonwealth University.

Background
Virginia-born Thomas Fortune Ryan converted to Roman Catholicism en route to Baltimore, Maryland in 1868. In Baltimore Ryan made his fortune in railroads and streetcar transit and married Ida Mary Barry, the daughter of a Catholic former employer. Ida contributed to various Catholic charities and causes, including in Virginia, but the Ryans' philanthropy in Richmond increased after they purchased a  plot in Nelson County, Virginia. In 1901, Ida donated money to build a church dedicated to the Sacred Heart in Manchester (now part of Richmond) so that worshippers did not have to cross the James River for services. She also provided funds for the construction of a school, a new chapel convent, and churches in Harrisonburg and Newport News (St. Vincent de Paul Catholic Church). They also funded projects in Washington, D.C. and New York. In 1901, Ida and Ryan each donated $250,000 to build a cathedral overlooking Monroe Park near the Fan district—in today's money, equivalent to $.

Historically, Richmond did not have a large or influential Catholic population, but it was growing at the turn of the century. Part of the plot for the church had been owned by the Diocese since 1865. The parish had planned for a  church at the location since 1882, but an effort to purchase the rest of the triangular block stalled until the Ryans' gift.

Construction
The Ryans chose Joseph Hubert McGuire as the church's architect. The church, bishop's house and pastoral home fill the entire block. The cornerstone was laid June 4, 1903, by Father Conway of St. Ignatius, New York; the stone block came from the Garden of Gethsemane. According to a diocesan official, it was the only cathedral in the world erected through the "sole munificence of one family".

The building is an example of Italian Renaissance Revival architecture. The cathedral's two front towers rise . The portico is supported by fluted Corinthian columns; the entablature features the phrase "If Ye Love Me Keep My Commandments", while the underside of the pediment is lined with fireproof tiles designed by Rafael Guastavino.

The cathedral was consecrated on Thanksgiving Day, November 29, 1906 in a series of ceremonies throughout the day. The church's consecration began at 6 am.

In the time period following the Second Vatican Council, the cathedral made radical alterations to its interior. The original high altar was destroyed and a freestanding altar was installed. The nave was enlarged and room made for a larger, more open sanctuary. The marble altar rails, present in the building since its construction, were destroyed. Confessionals were repurposed into display cases. Iconography and statuary which had previously adorned the sanctuary was removed.

Landmark
The cathedral is a Virginia Historic Landmark and is on the National Register for Historic Places.

Gallery

See also
List of Catholic cathedrals in the United States
List of cathedrals in the United States

References

External links

Cathedral Website
Diocese of Richmond Website

Roman Catholic churches completed in 1906
Churches on the National Register of Historic Places in Virginia
Roman Catholic churches in Richmond, Virginia
Italianate architecture in Virginia
Sacred Heart Richmond
Church buildings with domes
Museums in Richmond, Virginia
Religious museums in Virginia
History museums in Virginia
National Register of Historic Places in Richmond, Virginia
1906 establishments in Virginia
20th-century Roman Catholic church buildings in the United States
Italianate church buildings in the United States